The 1970 Wimbledon Championships was a tennis tournament that took place on the outdoor grass courts at the All England Lawn Tennis and Croquet Club in Wimbledon, London, United Kingdom. The tournament was held from Monday 22 June until Saturday 4 July 1970. It was the 84th staging of the Wimbledon Championships, and the third Grand Slam tennis event of 1970.

Prize money
The total prize money for 1970 championships was £41,650. The winner of the men's title earned £3,000 while the women's singles champion earned £1.500.

* per team

Champions

Seniors

Men's singles

 John Newcombe defeated  Ken Rosewall, 5–7, 6–3, 6–2, 3–6, 6–1 
It was Newcombe's 3rd career Grand Slam title (his 1st in the Open Era), and his 2nd Wimbledon title.

Women's singles

 Margaret Court defeated  Billie Jean King, 14–12, 11–9 
It was Court's 19th career Grand Slam title, and her 3rd (and last) Wimbledon title.

Men's doubles

 John Newcombe /  Tony Roche defeated  Ken Rosewall /  Fred Stolle, 10–8, 6–3, 6–1

Women's doubles

 Rosie Casals /  Billie Jean King defeated  Françoise Dürr /  Virginia Wade, 6–2, 6–3

Mixed doubles

 Ilie Năstase /  Rosie Casals defeated  Alex Metreveli /  Olga Morozova, 6–3, 4–6, 9–7

Juniors

Boys' singles

 Byron Bertram defeated  Frank Gebert, 6–0, 6–3

Girls' singles

 Sharon Walsh defeated  Marina Kroschina, 8–6, 6–4

Singles seeds

Men's singles
  Rod Laver (fourth round, lost to Roger Taylor)
  John Newcombe (champion)
  Arthur Ashe (fourth round, lost to Andrés Gimeno)
  Tony Roche (quarterfinals, lost to Ken Rosewall)
  Ken Rosewall (final, lost to John Newcombe)
  Željko Franulović (third round, lost to Bob Carmichael)
  Stan Smith (fourth round, lost to Roy Emerson)
  Ilie Năstase (fourth round, lost to Clark Graebner)
  Clark Graebner (quarterfinals, lost to Roger Taylor)
  Roy Emerson (quarterfinals, lost to John Newcombe)
  Tom Okker (second round, lost to Bob Hewitt)
  Cliff Drysdale (third round, lost to Tom Gorman)
  Jan Kodeš (first round, lost to Alex Metreveli)
  Andrés Gimeno (semifinals, lost to John Newcombe)
  Dennis Ralston (fourth round, lost to John Newcombe)
  Roger Taylor (semifinals, lost to Ken Rosewall)

Women's singles
 Margaret Court (champion)
 Billie Jean King (final, lost to Margaret Court)
 Virginia Wade (fourth round, lost to Ceci Martinez)
 Kerry Melville (fourth round, lost to Winnie Shaw)
 Rosie Casals (semifinals, lost to Margaret Court)
 Julie Heldman (fourth round, lost to Françoise Dürr)
 Karen Krantzcke (quarterfinals, lost to Billie Jean King)
 Helga Niessen (quarterfinals, lost to Margaret Court)

References

External links
 Official Wimbledon Championships website

 
Wimbledon Championships
Wimbledon Championships
Wimbledon Championships
Wimbledon Championships